620 Park Avenue is a luxury apartment building on the Upper East Side of Manhattan on Park Avenue between East 65th and 66th Streets.

History
620 Park Avenue was designed by J.E.R. Carpenter, who also designed 625 Park Avenue across the avenue; and constructed by Starrett Brothers construction in 1924. It features a limestone facade on the two lowest floors and a brick exterior for the upper 13 floors. It is a 15-story building featuring just 15 units each composed of a full floor. In recent years, it has become known for its conservative and often exclusionary co-op board and is known to avoid famous or notorious residents.

Notable residents
Dr. Paul Marks - former head of Sloan-Kettering

In popular culture
In the 1999 American film Being John Malkovich, 620 Park Avenue is featured as the home of John Malkovich.

References

Apartment buildings in New York City
Residential buildings in Manhattan
Condominiums and housing cooperatives in Manhattan
Park Avenue
Upper East Side
Residential buildings completed in 1924